Jeremy Howard may refer to:

 Jeremy Howard (entrepreneur) (born 1973), Australian scientist and entrepreneur
 Jeremy Howard (actor) (born 1981), American actor
 Jeremy D. Howard, American actor on MADtv

See also
Jeremy Howard-Williams (1922–1995), fighter pilot and author
Curly Howard (Jerome Lester "Jerry" Horwitz, 1903–1952), American comedian and vaudevillian actor